"Baptized in Fire" is a song by American rapper Kid Cudi featuring American rapper Travis Scott. It was released on December 1, 2016, as an instant-grat from the former's sixth studio album, Passion, Pain & Demon Slayin'. The song was produced by Mike Dean, Plain Pat, & Kid Cudi and samples "Deja Vu" by Mort Garson. It marks the third collaboration between the two artists, following the tracks "Way Back" and "Through the Late Night" from Scott’s album, Birds in the Trap Sing McKnight, also released in 2016.

Release and promotion
On December 1, 2016, the album was made available for pre-order on the iTunes Store, with "Baptized in Fire", featuring Travis Scott, as the "instant gratification track". It was released to Google Play the following day.

Critical reception
Adrian Marcano from Inverse named it as the fourth best song from the album and wrote that it "goes extra hard with a deep bassy twang that we hear on a lot of records that Travis is on". Noisey wrote: "The brooding track finds both artists showcasing their signature, crawling harmonies".

Charts

Release history

References

2016 songs
2016 singles
Kid Cudi songs
Songs written by Travis Scott
Songs written by Kid Cudi
Songs written by Mike Dean (record producer)
Songs written by Plain Pat
Republic Records singles
Travis Scott songs
Songs written by Mort Garson
Song recordings produced by Kid Cudi